Career in Rock is an album by the American band Volcano Suns, released in 1991. The album was recorded by the fourth lineup of the band. It was produced by Steve Albini.

Career in Rock was the band's final album; they announced a breakup before a 1992 show in Chicago.

Critical reception

The Boston Herald wrote that the band "never failed to produce an aggressive, tuneful—and loud—punk rush."

Track listing 

Side One
 "Blue Rib"
 "Binds That Tie"
 "Mystery Date"
 "Silly Misunderstanding"
 "Total Eclipse"

Side Two
 "Horrorscope"
 "Punching Bag"
 "Show"
 "Sensitachio"
 "Hey Monarch"

Personnel 
Recorded by Steve Albini
Peter Prescott 
Robert Weston
David Kleiler

References 

Volcano Suns albums
1991 albums
Quarterstick Records albums
Albums produced by Steve Albini